"Baby Doll" is a song co-written and recorded by American country music artist Pat Green.  It was released in March 2005 as the second single from the album Lucky Ones.  The song reached #21 on the Billboard Hot Country Songs chart.  The song was written by Green and Matchbox Twenty front man Rob Thomas.

Chart performance

References

2005 singles
2004 songs
Pat Green songs
Songs written by Rob Thomas (musician)
Song recordings produced by Don Gehman
Song recordings produced by Frank Rogers (record producer)
Show Dog-Universal Music singles
Songs written by Pat Green